Morimus plagiatus is a species of beetle in the family Cerambycidae. It was described by Waterhouse in 1881. It is known from India.

References

Phrissomini
Beetles described in 1881